The light heavyweight competition was the third-highest weight class featured in amateur boxing at the 2008 Summer Olympics, and was held at the Workers Indoor Arena. Light heavyweights were limited to a maximum of 81 kilograms in body mass.

Like all Olympic boxing events, the competition was a straight single-elimination tournament.  Both semifinal losers were awarded bronze medals, so no boxers competed again after their first loss. Bouts consisted of four rounds of two minutes each, with one-minute breaks between rounds.  Punches scored only if the white area on the front of the glove made full contact with the front of the head or torso of the opponent.  Five judges scored each bout; three of the judges had to signal a scoring punch within one second for the punch to score. The winner of the bout was the boxer who scored the most valid punches by the end of the bout.

The round of 32 was marked by injury when Samoa's Farani Tavui was taken to hospital after being knocked unconscious during his first match.

Medalists

Schedule
All times are China Standard Time (UTC+8)

Draw

Finals

Top half

Bottom half

See also
2009 World Amateur Boxing Championships – Light heavyweight

References

External links
 AIBA
 

Boxing at the 2008 Summer Olympics